Askarovo is the name of several rural localities in Russia:
Askarovo, Abzelilovsky District, Republic of Bashkortostan, a selo in Abzelilovsky District of the Republic of Bashkortostan
Askarovo, Burzyansky District, Republic of Bashkortostan, a village in Burzyansky District of the Republic of Bashkortostan
Askarovo, Kurgan Oblast, a village in Kurgan Oblast
Askarovo, Orenburg Oblast, a village in Orenburg Oblast